Marlon Andrés López Moreno (born 2 November 1992) is a Nicaraguan footballer who plays for Liga Primera club Real Estelí.

References

1992 births
Living people
Nicaraguan men's footballers
Nicaragua international footballers
Sportspeople from Managua
Nicaraguan expatriate footballers
Expatriate footballers in Costa Rica
Managua F.C. players
Real Estelí F.C. players
Santos de Guápiles footballers
Association football midfielders
2017 Copa Centroamericana players
2017 CONCACAF Gold Cup players
2019 CONCACAF Gold Cup players
Nicaragua under-20 international footballers
Nicaragua youth international footballers